Eisa Majrashi (born 19 July 1986, Jeddah) is a Saudi Arabian judoka who competes in the men's 60 kg category. At the 2012 Summer Olympics, he was defeated in the third round by Felipe Kitadai. Majrashi had a bye in the first round and beat Raúl Lall in the second.

References

Saudi Arabian male judoka
1986 births
Living people
Olympic judoka of Saudi Arabia
Judoka at the 2012 Summer Olympics
Judoka at the 2006 Asian Games
Judoka at the 2010 Asian Games
Judoka at the 2014 Asian Games
Sportspeople from Jeddah
Asian Games competitors for Saudi Arabia
21st-century Saudi Arabian people
20th-century Saudi Arabian people